Koloonella buijsi is a species of sea snail, a marine gastropod mollusk in the family Pyramidellidae, the pyrams and their allies.

The epithet "buijsi" refers to Mr J.P. Buijs, a malacologist from The Hague, the Netherlands,

Description
The size of the shell varies between 3 mm and 3.7 mm. The color of the smooth, slender conical shell varies between whitish to a creamy color. The teleoconch contains 4½ to 5½ slightly convex whorls with a marked suture and without a spiral mocrosculpture. The outerlip has an even structure, lacking teeth, and is smooth on the inside. There is no umbilicus.

Distribution
This species occurs in the following locations:
 Cape Verdes at a depth of  710 m.

References

 Robba E. (2013) Tertiary and Quaternary fossil pyramidelloidean gastropods of Indonesia. Scripta Geologica 144: 1-191

External links
 To Encyclopedia of Life
 To World Register of Marine Species

Murchisonellidae
Gastropods described in 2000
Gastropods of Cape Verde